Rody de Boer (born 22 August 1997) is a Dutch professional footballer who plays as a goalkeeper for Eerste Divisie club Roda JC.

Club career

Telstar
De Boer played youth football for ADO Den Haag and was fourth and third on the goalkeepers' depth-chart between 2014 and 2017. He failed to make his professional debut for the club. 

On 26 May 2017, De Boer joined Eerste Divisie club Telstar where he signed a two-year contract. He made his senior debut for the club on 18 August 2017 in a game against FC Eindhoven, starting in a 2–2 draw. During his one season at Telstar, he kept 11 clean sheets in 37 appearances and was rumoured to Premier League club AFC Bournemouth and Bundesliga club FC Augsburg following his impressive season.

AZ
De Boer moved to Eredivisie club AZ for undisclosed fee on 15 June 2018, signing a four-year contract. He became the backup to starter Marco Bizot, and therefore mainly played for Jong AZ in the Eerste Divisie. He would however pick up a serious shoulder injury in August 2018, sidelining him for several months.

He made his first-team debut for AZ on 21 December 2019 in a 3–0 away loss to Sparta Rotterdam. He replaced Dani de Wit in the 8th minute after Bizot had been sent off. He made his first start for the club in the following league game due to Bizot being suspended, in a 3–1 home loss to Willem II.

On 10 June 2020, De Boer was sent on a one-season loan to Eerste Divisie side De Graafschap.

Roda JC
On 6 July 2021, De Boer signed a three-year contract with Roda JC Kerkrade. He made his debut for the club on 7 August 2021, starting against former club De Graafschap and keeping a clean sheet in a 3–0 away win. He was the team's starter in goal during the 2021–22 season, keeping 12 clean sheets in 41 total appearances, and Roda were knocked out of promotion play-offs by Excelsior on 14 May 2022.

De Boer also started the 2022–23 season in goal for Roda, but lost his place in goal on the fifth matchday to newcomer Moritz Nicolas who was loaned in from Borussia Mönchengladbach.

International career
De Boer is a youth international for his country, making his first selection to the Netherlands under-18 on 5 November 2014 under coach Maarten Stekelenburg.

On 4 September 2016, De Boer made his debut for the Netherlands under-20s, starting in goal in a 1–1 friendly draw against Czech Republic.

Career statistics

References

External links
 Rody de Boer at Royal Dutch Football Association
 
 

Living people
1997 births
Footballers from The Hague
Association football goalkeepers
Dutch footballers
Netherlands youth international footballers
ADO Den Haag players
SC Telstar players
AZ Alkmaar players
Jong AZ players
De Graafschap players
Roda JC Kerkrade players
Eredivisie players
Eerste Divisie players